Dr. Sheldon Hawkes is a fictional character on the CBS crime drama CSI: NY  portrayed by Hill Harper. He was originally the sultry voiced medical examiner during the first season, but moves into the field in the start of the second season, much to the initial surprise of head CSI Mac Taylor.

Background
Hawkes was a child prodigy who graduated from college at eighteen, and by 24 he was a fully licensed board certified surgeon. After a tumultuous surgical career in which he was often at odds with his boss and after losing two patients on the operating table (shown in flashback in episode 309, "And Here's To You, Mrs Azrael"), he abandoned surgery in favor of the medical examiner's office. He evidently sleeps at the morgue sometimes, as he has a cot there in episode 103, "American Dreamers."
In season 2 he moves out of the morgue and becoming an invaluable member of the investigation team both in the lab and the field. His badge number is "9010". Due to his medical background, he is sometimes referred to as "Doc" by his colleagues. 
In "Blood Actually", Sheldon had a disagreement with Danny Messer regarding a heavy-set victim at a crime scene they were investigating. But later, Sheldon showed Danny a picture of himself that he was overweight and later lost the weight to impress a girl, reminding Danny that what's on the inside of a person is what really counts.

On the job
Hawkes is a sympathetic soul who is willing to lend an ear to anyone who needs to talk.  During "Murder Sings the Blues" (episode 307) he is shown in flashback to have met a girl at a party.  The girl felt unhappy, so Hawkes took her out for a cup of coffee and listened to her tell him her troubles.  Afterwards, he gave her his phone number if she ever felt like she needed to talk to him again.  The girl is found dead two weeks later on board a subway car following a rave party, with Hawkes' phone number still on her person.  Hawkes, when he discovers his phone number in the girl's possession, neglects to tell Mac about his connection to her, which earns him a dressing-down from Mac in front of the entire lab.  Later, Hawkes apologizes to Mac for not disclosing how he knew the victim and tells his story. Their relationship has clearly mended by episode 309 ("And Here's To You, Mrs Azrael"), when Mac confides about his father's lingering death from cancer, and Sheldon comforts him. This dialogue also indicates that Hawkes is opposed to euthanasia. On a few episodes, such as "Hammer Down", "It Happened To Me", and "Scared Stiff", Dr. Hawkes tends to get emotional when a murder is medical-related, or if the suspect happens to be a doctor. Hawkes has been the victim of racism while out in the field especially in dealings with white supremacist Micheal Elgers. In "Green Piece", Hawkes investigating the bombing of a house, is led to Elgers who is adorned with Nazi tattoos all over his body and other white power propaganda is discovered in Elgers' apartment. Elgers lays into Hawkes calling him inferior, an affirmative action case, but Hawkes stands his ground. In "Yahrzeit", Hawkes is faced with the death of his uncle and plans to fly to Michigan for the funeral, however the flight is delayed and Hawkes decides to help the team investigate the murder of an auctioneer. He offers to assist Danny Messer with Messer informing his friend that he's about to question Micheal Elgers. Hawkes defiantly states, "He's a vicious racist and that's his problem". Elgers once again targets Hawkes for being black, but like before, Hawkes maintains composure. Hawkes remains in New York long enough to see Elgers arrested for crimes unrelated to the murder before taking his flight to be with his family to honor his uncle.

Trouble with the killer Shane Casey
In episode 304, "Hung Out To Dry," Hawkes is targeted by killer Shane Casey.  Several years before, when Hawkes was the M.E., his testimony helped send Shane's brother, Ian, to jail for a robbery-homicide at a neighborhood pub.  Ian Casey committed suicide while awaiting sentencing and Shane blamed several people, including Hawkes. Shane murders the jury foreperson and a witness to Ian's original crime before the team makes the connection to Hawkes and the previous case.  In the episode "Raising Shane," (3.11) Shane orchestrates a plot that implicates Hawkes in a robbery-homicide in deliberate imitation of Ian's case. Shane demands that the team find evidence to prove Ian's innocence in return for the evidence that will exonerate Hawkes. Though the team is assigned to a different case because of a conflict of interest, they find that the new case is, strangely enough, connected to Hawkes', and through the team's diligence, they are able to help clear Hawkes' name and secure his freedom, as well as prove Ian Casey's guilt in a twist of tragic irony and Shane was arrested. On his release, Sheldon is warmly embraced by Stella Bonasera. In "Redemptio" (6.19), Hawkes finds himself in Casey's crosshairs again in 2010 inadvertently when Hawkes travels to Pennsylvania to witness the execution of killer and drug dealer Reginald Tiford. Tiford was suspected by the Hawkes' family of having killed Sheldon's sister in 1999. A corrections officer dies shortly before the execution is carried out. Hawkes suspects Tiford of THIS murder to delay the sentence. A full prison riot erupts with Hawkes spotting Casey in the prison's general population. Tiford earlier pleaded with Hawkes that he was not responsible for Hawkes's sister's death. Tiford becomes Sheldon's most unlikely ally during the riot even delivering a prison jumpsuit so Hawkes could blend in. The murdered C.O. is discovered to have died from cyanide poisoning and while Hawkes and Tiford are in Casey's cell investigating they discover Casey formulated the cyanide from grinding up peach seeds and extracting the cyanide before Casey tainted the guard's food. Casey with help from a guard he's blackmailing changes into an NYPD patrol officer's uniform and escapes in full view of the Pennsylvania State Police. Tiford attempts to subdue Casey before his escape but Casey adorned in a police officer's dress is allowed to leave after killing Tiford to free the man believed to be a cop. Hawkes runs out of the prison to save Tiford but he too is restrained as his own dress makes him look like another inmate. Hawkes tries to explain but is still detained allowing Casey to escape and resume his reign of terror on Hawkes and the Messer family. Upon release, Hawkes visits his sister's gravesite with flowers in a fog of regret that he did not do much to save her.

While investigating the death of a diving instructor, Sheldon briefly becomes trapped underwater. Despite being injured and suffering from hypoxia, Sheldon is freed with the help of fellow CSI Danny Messer, who was diving with him. After they are safe, Hawkes admits that he envisioned coroner Sid Hammerback preparing to do an autopsy on him (episode 402, "The Deep").

At the start of season 6, the rest of the team notices how Sheldon appears distracted and insisting on working overtime a lot. In episode 606 "It Happened to Me," he's staying on the couch of a friend's apartment when the man is arrested for embezzlement. Sheldon claims he was just crashing for the night but Flack and Mac don't believe him. Chasing a suspect in the killing of a man who stole from his company, Sheldon talks the suicidal man down by revealing the truth: He has lost all his savings in a fraud scheme and was forced to sell his house. He confesses he was ashamed to tell anyone and Stella informs him he can count on friends for help. Proving her words, Mac lets Sheldon stay at his guest room until he gets back on his feet. On a later episode, Hawkes has revealed that he is moving to a new residence, while Mac joked about getting his sofa/couch back.

Personal life
In episode 512, it was revealed that an ex-girlfriend of Hawkes' was a victim of a serial rapist years ago. The aftermath of the event led their relationship to fall apart. When the rapist strikes another victim, Hawkes becomes furious and a little obsessed with finding the rapist and putting him away, leading him to clash with Mac over the methods of obtaining evidence and over Hawkes' personal connection to one of the victims. He is removed from the case as a result. The rapist is eventually caught by Stella.

In episode 522, Sheldon reminisces to Danny Messer about his just-deceased uncle Frank, who had witnessed the assassination of Martin Luther King Jr., and whose dignified resilience to racism, and pride in his nephew, had been formative in Sheldon's life. That pride was on full display at the uncle's house when upon graduating from med school, Frank placed a sign on his house reading THIS IS THE HOME OF THE UNCLE OF DOCTOR SHELDON HAWKES.

In the episode "Hammer Down", Sheldon displays his anger while interrogating a suspect with Flack. Being a doctor who had lost all of his savings in a scheme, he berated the suspect, who is also a doctor, for using the female victims' organs and body parts for transplanting, among other things for money while Flack watches. "Hammer Down" is part of the CSI trilogy in which Dr. Raymond Langston (played by Laurence Fishburne), of the Las Vegas Crime Lab investigates the kidnapping of a young woman in Miami, who was later believed to have been taken from Las Vegas.

New girl-friend Camille Jordanson
On the episode "Food For Thought", the usually reliable and smart Sheldon calls in sick so he can go on a date with an old friend Camille Jordanson, who was involved in a crime and kidnapped in the episode Smooth Criminal. The informal dinner date turns into an explosive crime scene. After one night of partying, Sheldon showed up late for work as Danny covers for him. He was later tested positive for cannabis sativa, which was determined by Mac. Mac gave Sheldon a mild scolding about his faking sick and the test result. But, Sheldon argued that the marijuana, which was found on Camille's bedside, was passive or second-hand. And that Sheldon has not had time for a personal life due to the high demands of his job. Mac lectured Sheldon about the oath they took that comes with their jobs, and tells Sheldon to go home and get some sleep. Camille shows up at Sheldon's place for another night. Camille is never seen or mentioned again; their relationship afterwards is unknown. It is suggested that they either broke up or Camille slowed down as he was never scolded again.

Relationship with colleagues
Hawkes is shown to be an amiable character who is well-liked by colleagues and passionate about the job. He is good friends with Danny Messer and the two are sometimes seen joking with new members of the team (new Homicide Detective Angell in season 3 "People With Money" and new CSI Detective Jo Danville in the season 7 opener). Although he has let his personal life interfere with his work on several occasions, he still maintains good working relationships with the rest of the team, especially his supervisor Mac.

References 

CSI: NY characters
Fictional African-American people
Fictional forensic scientists
Fictional medical examiners
Fictional New York City Police Department detectives
Fictional surgeons
Television characters introduced in 2004